Slemon is a surname. Notable people with the surname include:

 Gordon Slemon (1924–2011), Canadian electrical engineer and professor
 Roy Slemon (1904–1992), Canadian Air Force Chief
 Sean Slemon (born 1978), South African artist

See also 
 Slemon Park, Prince Edward Island
 Slemons